Nocher II (died 1019), Count of Bar-sur-Aube, Count of Soissons. He was the son of Nocher I, Count of Bar-sur-Aube. Nocher's brother Beraud (d. 1052) was Bishop of Soissons.

Nocher became Count of Soissons, jure uxoris, upon his marriage to Adelise, Countess of Soissons.  Nocher and Adelisa had three children:
 Nocher III (d. 1040), Count of Bar-sur-Aube, had at least two daughters by unknown wife:
 Adèle (d. 1053), Countess of Bar-sur-Aube
 Isabeau
 Guy, archbishop of Reims
 Renaud I, Count of Soissons

Nocher's son and namesake became Count of Bar-sur-Aube upon his death, and the countship of Soissons reverted to his wife.  His son Renaud would eventually become the Count of Soissons.

References

Sources

External links
Dormay, C., Histoire de la ville de Soissons et de ses rois, ducs, comtes et gouverneurs, Soissons, 1664 (available on Google Books)

Counts of Soissons